Michael Howard (born 1965) is a software security expert from Microsoft. He is the author of several computer security books, the most famous being  Michael Howard is a frequent speaker at security-related conferences and frequently publishes articles on the subject.

Books 
 Michael Howard, David LeBlanc : Writing Secure Code (2nd edition). 
 Michael Howard, John Viega, David LeBlanc: The 19 Deadly Sins of Software Security. 
 Michael Howard: Designing Secure Web-Based Applications for Microsoft(r) Windows(r) 2000.

External links
 Michael Howard's Blog

Microsoft employees
Living people
Writers about computer security
1965 births